The Icland is a right tributary of the river Lechința in Romania. It flows into the Lechința in Iclandu Mare.

References

Rivers of Romania
Rivers of Mureș County